1978 Emmy Awards may refer to:

 30th Primetime Emmy Awards, the 1978 Emmy Awards ceremony honoring primetime programming
 5th Daytime Emmy Awards, the 1978 Emmy Awards ceremony honoring daytime programming
 6th International Emmy Awards, the 1978 Emmy Awards ceremony honoring international programming

Emmy Award ceremonies by year